Berkswell Marsh is a 7.5 hectare (18.5 acre) biological site of Special Scientific Interest in the West Midlands, en. The site was notified in 1991 under the Wildlife and Countryside Act 1981. It is located in the Meriden Gap which is between Birmingham and Coventry.

See also
List of Sites of Special Scientific Interest in the West Midlands

References
 Berkswell Marsh citation sheet Natural England. Retrieved on 2008-05-28

Sites of Special Scientific Interest notified in 1991
Sites of Special Scientific Interest in the West Midlands (county)